The 2011–12 season was Swindon Town's 4th consecutive season in League One having one promotion from League Two in 2006–07. Swindon were relegated from League One. The club also competed in the FA Cup, the League Cup and the Football League Trophy.

Competitions

Football League One

League table

Results

FA Cup

League Cup

Football League Trophy

Players

Appearances and goals
Last updated 28 June 2011

|}

Disciplinary record

Includes all competitive matches.

2010-11 Season stats

References

Swindon Town F.C. seasons
Swindon Town